Bob or Bobby Wallace may refer to:
Bobby Wallace (American football) (born 1954), college football coach at the University of North Alabama
Bobby Wallace (baseball) (1873–1960), Baseball Hall of Fame member
Bobby Wallace (footballer) (1908–1991), Scottish footballer with Hamilton Academical and Dumbarton
Bob Wallace (computer scientist) (1949–2002), early Microsoft employee
Bob Wallace (footballer, born 1893) (1893–1970), Scottish footballer (Nottingham Forest)
Bob Wallace (footballer, born 1948), English footballer
Bob Wallace (American football) (born 1945), former American football wide receiver and tight end
Bob Wallace (test driver) (1938–2013), racing driver from New Zealand who was instrumental in the founding of automaker Lamborghini
Bob Wallace (athlete) (1951–2020), Australian marathon runner

See also
Robert Wallace (disambiguation)
Bob Wallis (1934–1991), British jazz musician